The Leventritt Competition was a highly prestigious international competition for classical pianists and violinists. It was founded in 1939 by the Edgar M. Leventritt Foundation Inc. of Cold Spring, New York, in memory of jurist Edgar M. Leventritt. The Leventritt Competition has now been discontinued.

More recently, the Cliburn contest in Fort Worth, Texas, has attracted more publicity. The Leventritt award was sparingly given, and there was no award presented if the judges felt the required standard was not achieved.

Award winners

 1941: Sidney Foster, piano
 1942: Erno Valasek, violin The New York Times, October 11, 1941
 1943: Eugene Istomin, piano
 1945: Louise Meiszner, piano
 1946: David Nadien, violin
 1947: Alexis Weissenberg, piano
 1948: Jean Graham, piano
 1949: Gary Graffman, piano
 1954: Van Cliburn, piano
 1955: Betty-Jean Hagen, violin
 1957: Anton Kuerti, piano
 1958: Arnold Steinhardt, violin
 1959: Malcolm Frager, piano
 1962: Michel Block, piano
 1964: Itzhak Perlman, violin
 1965: Tong-Il Han, piano
 1967: Kyung-wha Chung, violin and Pinchas Zukerman, violin (joint recipients)
 1969: Joseph Kalichstein, piano
 1976: No first prize awarded
 1978: Mitchell Stern, violin
 1981: Cecile Licad, piano

References

Bibliography

1939 establishments in New York (state)
Awards established in 1939
Classical music awards
Piano competitions in the United States
Recurring events established in 1939
Violin competitions
Music festivals established in 1939